Lance Clayton Richbourg (December 18, 1897 – September 10, 1975) was an American professional baseball player who was a Major League right fielder for eight seasons between  and .  Richbourg played college baseball for the University of Florida, and thereafter, he played professionally for the Philadelphia Phillies, Washington Senators, Boston Braves and Chicago Cubs. Richbourg was a career .308 hitter (806-2619) with 13 home runs and 247 RBI in 698 games played.

Early years 

Richbourg was born in DeFuniak Springs, Florida, in the Florida Panhandle, in 1897.  He graduated from Walton High School in DeFuniak Springs.  The high school adopted the nickname of "Braves" because Richbourg was a member of the Boston Braves in 1926.

College career 

He attended the University of Florida in Gainesville, Florida, where he played for the Florida Gators baseball team for a single season in 1919.  He graduated from Florida with a bachelor's degree in 1922.  In between stints in the major leagues, Richbourg returned to Gainesville to coach the Gators baseball team in 1922 and 1923, and again in 1926.  He compiled a win–loss record of 39–21 (.650) in his three seasons as the Gators' head coach.

Richbourg died in Crestview, Florida, in 1975; he was 77 years old.

See also 

 Boston Braves all-time roster
 Chicago Cubs all-time roster
 List of Florida Gators baseball players
 List of University of Florida alumni
 Philadelphia Phillies all-time roster

References

External links 

1897 births
1975 deaths
Baseball players from Florida
Boston Braves players
Chicago Cubs players
Florida Gators baseball coaches
Florida Gators baseball players
Major League Baseball right fielders
Minor league baseball managers
People from DeFuniak Springs, Florida
Philadelphia Phillies players
Washington Senators (1901–1960) players
People from Crestview, Florida
Nashville Vols players
Charleston Pals players
Chattanooga Lookouts players
Dallas Submarines players
Dothan (minor league baseball) players
Grand Rapids Joshers players
Milwaukee Brewers (minor league) players
Newark Bears (IL) players
Newport News Shipbuilders players
Oakland Oaks (baseball) players
Richmond Colts players
Toledo Mud Hens players